German submarine U-765 was a German Type VIIC U-boat created for service in World War II. U-765 was notable for not suffering any casualties until the time of her sinking. The U-boat did not sink or damage any ships.

Design
German Type VIIC submarines were preceded by the shorter Type VIIB submarines. U-765 had a displacement of  when at the surface and  while submerged. She had two shafts and two  propellers.

U-765 was fitted with five  torpedo tubes (four fitted at the bow and one at the stern), fourteen torpedoes, one  SK C/35 naval gun, 220 rounds, and two twin  C/30 anti-aircraft guns. The boat had a complement of between forty-four and sixty.

Fate
The attack left 37 dead and 11 survivors.

References

Bibliography

External links

German Type VIIC submarines
World War II submarines of Germany
U-boats sunk by British aircraft
U-boats sunk by British warships
U-boats sunk by depth charges
U-boats commissioned in 1943
U-boats sunk in 1944
World War II shipwrecks in the Atlantic Ocean
1943 ships
Ships built in Wilhelmshaven
Maritime incidents in May 1944